Château DIY (known as Escape To The Château DIY until 2020) is a Channel 4 reality television series which follows the stories of various British families who are renovating châteaux in France, or looking at ones to purchase. It was narrated by Dick Strawbridge who, along with his wife Angel Adoree, provides help and advice to some of these owners until 2020. The programme was spawned from the associated series Escape to the Chateau. For 2021 onwards, the programme was renamed Château DIY with new narrator Adjoa Andoh.

Episode list

Escape To The Chateau DIY

Series 1

Series 2

Series 3

Series 4 
Series 4 commenced on 23 March 2020 and was scheduled to run to 30 episodes. Covid-19 interrupted filming and editing, so only 20 episodes were broadcast up to 17 April 2020.

Series 5 
Series 5 commenced on 30 November 2020.

Château DIY
In December 2020 Channel 4 ordered 60 new episodes from Spark Media Partners for broadcast in 2021 and 2022. The programme was renamed Château DIY following the decision by the Strawbridges to withdraw from the DIY offshoot and retain the brand "Escape to the Château".

Series 1 
Series 1 of Château DIY, presented by Adjoa Andoh, with 15 episodes, began airing on 27 September 2021 on Channel Four.

Christmas 2021 series
Four Christmas-themed episodes were broadcast on Channel 4 commencing on 20 December 2021.

Series 2 
Series 2 of Chateau DIY began airing on Channel 4 on 30 May 2022. 15 episodes were broadcast.

Series 3 
Series 3 of Chateau DIY began airing on Channel 4 on 22 August 2022. 30 episodes were broadcast.

List of châteaux
Source:
 Abbaye de la Bussière
 Château Caillac
 Château de Bois Giraud
 Château de Bourneau
 Château de Brametourte
 Château de Brives
 Château de Dohem
 Château de Jalesnes
 Château de Joli Bois
 Château de la Basmaignée, Pays de la Loire
 Château de La Fare
 Château de la Motte-Husson
 Château de La Ruche
 Château de La Vigne
 Château de Lalande, Centre-Val de Loire
 Château de Lomenie
 Château de Lucheux
 Château de Montvason
 Château de Rosières
 Château de Saugé
 Château de Seguenville
 Château de St-Ferriol
 Château de Thuriés
 Château des Lys
 Château d'Humières
 Château du Bailleul
 Château du Doux, Limousin
 Château du Masgelier
 Château du Puits es Pratx
 Château Flore (Château d'Humeroeuille)
 Château Gioux
 Château Gonneville sur Honfleur ("Le Fleur"), Normandy
 Château La Briance
 Château La Grande Maison
 Château La Perriere
 Château Lagorce, Aquitaine
 Château Les Bernards
 Château Madame de Miremont
 Château Mareuil
 Château Mas du Pradié
 Château Monteil
 Domaine de la Barde, Périgueux
 Domaine de la Salle, Charente Maritime
 Le Vieux Château, Basse-Normandie

References

External links 

Official website – Chateau DIY
Chateau DIY at Channel 4

Official website – Escape to the Chateau DIY

2018 British television series debuts
Business-related television series in the United Kingdom
Channel 4 original programming
English-language television shows
Home renovation television series
Television shows set in France